Parnell Gale was Mayor of Galway in 1817.

Political career

Prior to serving as Mayor, Parnell Gale was a collector of excise in Galway in 1815.

Parnell Gale’s term as major was marked by social unrest. Caused in part by meteorological conditions sparked off by volcanic activity, food shortages were prevalent in Galway in early 1817.  In January 1817, Mayor Gale believed food riots could be controlled and resisted efforts to invoke the Peace Preservation Act, the equivalent of martial law. However, by March 1817, Gale was not so confident in maintaining order and in a letter to Dublin Castle, requested the cavalry be sent since mounted troops might more effectively pursue rioters. Rioters were attacking stores and merchant’s houses as well as removing the sails from ships so that vessels could not carry provisions from the town.

A good harvest and falling market prices finally brought the disturbances of 1817 to an end.

Personal life

Parnell Gale was born in Queen’s County (present day County Laois), Ireland, the son of Anthony Gale and Anne Delany.

Parnell Gale is the brother of Anthony Gale, fourth Commandant of the United States Marine Corps.

Parnell Gale is buried at St. Nicholas' Collegiate Church in Galway. The inscription on Parnell Gale’s burial monument reads: 
""

See also
Ashfield Gales

Notes

Ancestry

Bibliography

Mayors of Galway
1818 deaths
Politicians from County Laois
Politicians from County Galway
Year of birth missing